Tribulus terrestris is an annual plant in the caltrop family (Zygophyllaceae) widely distributed around the world. It is adapted to thrive in dry climate locations in which few other plants can survive. 

It is native to warm temperate and tropical regions in southern Eurasia and Africa. It has been unintentionally introduced to North America and Australia. An aggressive and hardy invasive species, T. terrestris is widely known as a noxious weed because of its small woody fruit – the bur – having long sharp and strong spines which easily penetrate surfaces, such as bare feet or thin shoes of crop workers and other pedestrians, the rubber of bicycle tires, and the mouths and skin of grazing animals.

Names
Like many weedy species, this plant has numerous common names according to the world region, including goat's-head, bindii, bullhead, burra gokharu, bhakhdi, caltrop, small caltrops, cat's-head, devil's eyelashes, devil's-thorn, devil's-weed, puncture vine, and tackweed.

Description

Tribulus terrestris is a taprooted herbaceous plant that grows as a summer annual in temperate climates.

Growth pattern
They are usually prostrate, forming flat patches, though they may grow more upwards in shade or among taller plants.

Leaves and stem

Stems branch from the crown and are densely hairy. Leaves are opposite and pinnately compound.

Inflorescence
In Southern California, it blooms from April through October, where it is highly invasive in waste places and disturbed sites.

Fruit

After the flower blooms, a fruit develops that easily falls apart into five burs. These burs strikingly resemble goats' or bulls' heads, characteristics which give the bur its common names in some regions. The "horns" are sharp enough to puncture bicycle tires and other air-filled tires. They can also cause painful injury to bare feet and can injure the mouths of livestock grazing on the plant.

Within each bur, seeds are stacked on top of each other, separated by a hard membrane. As an adaptation to dry climates, the largest seed germinates first, while the others may wait until more moisture is available before germinating. The bur spines point upward, where they stick into feet and fur of animals, serving the purpose of seed dispersal. This causes damage to domesticated livestock and degrades wool.

Range and habitat
T. terrestris is now widespread throughout the world from latitudes 35°S to 47°N. It is distributed across warm temperate and tropical regions of southern Europe, southern Asia, throughout Africa, New Zealand, and Australia. It is also present across southern North America and in Central and South America. Over the 20th century, it appeared in California and became distributed northward, eventually appearing in British Columbia, Canada where it is classified as a noxious weed.

A network of fine rootlets arise from the taproot allow the plant to survive in arid conditions. It grows in almost any soil, but thrives in dry, loose, sandy soils, and even in sand or in deserts. It can prosper in heavier soils, especially if fertile or moist, and on compacted soils along roadsides.

Etymology
The Greek word, τρίβολος meaning 'water-chestnut', translated into Latin as tribulos. The Latin name tribulus originally meant the caltrop (a spiky weapon of similar shape), but in Classical times the word already meant this plant as well.

Cultivation
The plant is widely naturalized in the Americas and also in Australia south of its native range. In some states in the United States, it is considered a noxious weed and an invasive species. It is a declared plant (infestations described under "caltrop") in South Australia.

Uses
The leaves and shoots are eaten in East Asia. The stems have been used as a thickener, added to diluted buttermilk to give it the appearance of undiluted buttermilk. There is some evidence that T. terrestris was used in traditional medicine.

Dietary supplement
Although its extract has been used as a dietary supplement since the 1980s in belief that it increases testosterone levels to aid body building or sexual enhancement in men, T. terrestris did not consistently affect testosterone levels in controlled studies, has not been proven to be safe, and may adversely interact with prescription drugs. High-quality research on T. terrestris extract has not been conducted, and no reviews indicate that it has strength-enhancing properties, or anabolic steroid effects for use as a body-building supplement or sexual enhancement. The Australian Institute of Sport discourages athletes from using T. terrestris supplements.

Phytochemistry
Phytochemicals of T. terrestris include steroidal saponins.

Eradication

In areas where it is an invasive species, T. terrestris is often sought to be eradicated. However, T. terrestris is considered a hardy plant, and its seeds remain viable for up to three years, making complete eradication difficult.

Physical
In smaller areas, T. terrestris is best controlled with manual removal, using a hoe to cut the plant off at its taproot. While this is effective, removing the entire plant by gripping the taproot, stem or trunk and pulling upward to remove the taproot is far more effective. This requires monitoring the area and removing the weed throughout the preseeding time (late spring and early summer in many temperate areas). This will greatly reduce the prevalence of the weed the following year. Mowing is not an effective method of eradication, because the plant grows flat against the ground.

Another avenue of physical eradication is to crowd out the opportunistic weed by providing good competition from favorable plants. Aerating compacted sites and planting competitive desirable plants, including broad-leaved grasses such as St. Augustine, can reduce the effect of T. terrestris by reducing resources available to the weed.

In June 2014, the town of Irrigon, Oregon, announced it would pay a bounty of one dollar for each large trash bag of puncturevine.

Chemical
Chemical control is generally recommended for home control of T. terrestris. There are few pre-emergent herbicides that are effective. Products containing oryzalin, benefin, or trifluralin will provide partial control of germinating seeds. These must be applied prior to germination (late winter to midspring).

After plants have emerged from the soil (postemergent), products containing 2,4-Dichlorophenoxyacetic acid (2,4-D), glyphosate, and dicamba are effective on T. terrestris. Like most postemergents, they are more effectively maintained when caught small and young. Dicamba and 2,4-D will cause harm to most broad-leaved plants, so the user should take care to avoid over-application. They can be applied to lawns without injuring the desired grass. Glyphosate will kill or injure most plants, so it should only be used as a spot treatment or on solid stands of the weed.  A product from DuPont called Pastora is highly effective but expensive and not for lawn use.

Biological
Two weevils, Microlarinus lareynii and M. lypriformis, native to India, France, and Italy, were introduced into the United States as biocontrol agents in 1961. Both species of weevils are available for purchase from biological suppliers, but purchase and release is not often recommended because weevils collected from other areas may not survive at the purchaser's location.

Microlarinus lareynii is a seed weevil that deposits its eggs in the young burr or flower bud. The larvae feed on and destroy the seeds before they pupate, emerge, disperse, and start the cycle over again. Its life cycle time is 19 to 24 days. Microlarinus lypriformis is a stem weevil that has a similar life cycle, excepting the location of the eggs, which includes the undersides of stems, branches, and the root crown. The larvae tunnel in the pith where they feed and pupate. Adults of both species overwinter in plant debris. Although the stem weevil is slightly more effective than the seed weevil when each is used alone, the weevils are most effective if used together and the T. terrestris plant is moisture-stressed.

Toxicity
Toxic compounds in the plant are known to cause liver damage when ingested at harmful dosages. When ingested, phylloerythrin accumulates in the blood as a byproduct of chlorophyl degradation; however, adverse reactions have not been confirmed in humans.
In sheep, consumption of T. terrestris causes tribulosis, also known as 'geeldikkop', which is a type of photodermatitis. Two alkaloids that seem to cause limb paresis (staggers) in sheep that eat Tribulus terrestris are the beta-carboline alkaloids harman (harmane) and norharman (norharmane). The alkaloid content of dried foliage is about 44 mg/kg.

References

External links
Tribulus terrestris List of Chemicals (Dr. Duke's Databases)

Flora of Africa
Flora of Australia
Flora of Europe
Flora of tropical Asia
Plants described in 1753
Taxa named by Carl Linnaeus
terrestris